Henri Kontinen and John Peers were the defending champions, but lost in the first round to Kei Nishikori and Dominic Thiem.
Thanasi Kokkinakis and Jordan Thompson won the title, defeating Gilles Müller and Sam Querrey, 7–6(9–7), 6–4.

Seeds

Draw

References
 Main Draw

Brisbane International - Doubles
2017 Brisbane International